Abraham Harawitz (May 8, 1879 – May 24, 1935) was a Russian-born Jewish-American lawyer, politician, and judge from New York.

Life 
Harawitz was born on May 8, 1879 in Minsk, Russia, the son of Moses and Mollie Harawitz. He immigrated to America when he was seven and grew up on the Lower East Side in New York City.

After attending public school, Harawitz studied in the College of the City of New York from 1895 to 1898. He then went to the New York University School of Law, graduating from there with an LL.B. in 1900. After graduating, he worked as a lawyer in New York City, with an office in 7 Beekman Street.

Harawitz joined the Tammany Hall Club of the Eighth Assembly District immediately after he was admitted to the bar and became active in Tammany Hall. In 1905, he was elected to the New York State Assembly as a Democrat, representing the New York County 8th District. He was elected over Louis Freidel and Jacob Panken. He served in the Assembly in 1906 and 1907. In the latter year, he had been elected with support from the Independence League. He refused to serve a third term in the Assembly. He was a delegate to the 1915 New York State Constitutional Convention. By then, he had a law office on Broadway.

In 1927, Harawitz was elected Justice of the Municipal Court over Jacob Panken. He was still serving as Justice when he died. Upon his death, Mayor La Guardia appointed Louis J. Lefkowitz to replace him to the Municipal Court.

Harawitz was married to Nettie Zolty. Their children were Howard L. and Milton.

Harawitz died in his apartment in the Broadway Central Hotel from a two-week illness on May 24, 1935. He was buried in Mount Zion Cemetery.

References

External links 

 The Political Graveyard

1879 births
1935 deaths
Politicians from Minsk
American people of Belarusian-Jewish descent
Jews from the Russian Empire
Emigrants from the Russian Empire to the United States
People from the Lower East Side
City College of New York alumni
New York University School of Law alumni
20th-century American lawyers
Lawyers from New York City
Jewish American attorneys
Politicians from Manhattan
20th-century American politicians
United States Independence Party politicians
Democratic Party members of the New York State Assembly
Jewish American state legislators in New York (state)
20th-century American judges
New York (state) state court judges
Burials at Mount Zion Cemetery (New York City)